Georgiy Lvovich Muradov (born 19 November 1954), is a Russian politician, statesman, and diplomat. He is currently the Deputy Chairman of the Council of Ministers of Crimea, and the Permanent Representative of the Republic of Crimea under the President of the Russia since 7 August 2014. He is also currently the advisor to the Mayor of Moscow.

Muradov as served as the ambassador to Cyprus from 1996 to 1999. He is also the acting , and the acting State Councilor of the city of Moscow, 1st class, awarded in 2000.

Biography
Georgiy Muradov was born on 19 November 1954, in the village of Kochmes of the Inta region of the Komi Autonomous Soviet Socialist Republic, to his parents, Lev Vladimirovich, his father, and Yelena Shapovalova, his mother, and to a family of doctors, and participants in the Great Patriotic War. Lev, (born in 1910 in Krasnodar), was Armenian by nationality, and a major of the medical service.

In 1972, he graduated from the secondary special (English) school number 36 of Krasnodar.

From 1972 to 1974, he was a student of the evening department of the Faculty of Romance and Germanic Philology of the Kuban State University in Krasnodar.

In 1979, he graduated with honors from the Moscow State Institute of International Relations (University) of the Soviet Ministry of Foreign Affairs, with a specialty in international relations.

From 1979 to 1992, Muradov was in the diplomatic service in Greece. He worked in various positions in the central office and foreign missions of the Soviet and Russian Foreign Ministries.

From 1992 to 1996, he was the Counselor-Minister of the Embassy of Russia in Sofia, Bulgaria.

In 1996, he graduated from the diplomatic courses of the Diplomatic Academy. He has a doctorate in history.

On 18 November 1996, Muradov served as the Russian Ambassador to Cyprus, until 25 October 1999.

From 2000 to 2007, he was the Head of the Moscow Department of International Relations.

From 2007 to 2010, he was the Head of the Department of Foreign Economic and International Relations of the city of Moscow.

On 7 August 2014, Muradov became a Deputy Chairman of the Council of Ministers of the Republic of Crimea, and a  Permanent Representative of the Republic of Crimea to the President of Russia. He was included in the list of persons sanctioned by the European Union for actions aimed at undermining the territorial integrity of Ukraine.

Personal life

Family
He is married to Irina Yuryevna Muradova and has three sons: Yury, Sergey and Albert.

Languages
He is fluent in English, Greek and Bulgarian.

References

1954 births
Living people
Moscow State Institute of International Relations alumni
Recipients of the Order of Honour (Russia)
Recipients of the Order of Holy Prince Daniel of Moscow
Ambassadors of Russia to Cyprus
Kuban State University alumni
Russian individuals subject to the U.S. Department of the Treasury sanctions
Russian individuals subject to European Union sanctions